Ioan Langdon Evans (born 22 September 2001) is a Welsh professional footballer who most recently played as a defender for League Two side Newport County.

Career
Evans is a product of the Newport County Academy. On 4 September 2019 Evans made his debut for Newport as a half time substitute for Matt Dolan in the 5-4 defeat to West Ham United Under-21s in the EFL Trophy Southern Group E. He was released by the club at the end of the 2019–20 season.

External links

References

2001 births
Living people
Welsh footballers
Association football defenders
Newport County A.F.C. players
Swansea City A.F.C. players